"Goodbyes" is a song by English musician James Cottriall, from his first studio album Sincerely Me. It was released in Austria as a digital download on 10 December 2010. It entered the Austrian Singles Chart at number 72. The song was written by James Cottriall and produced by Markus Weiß, Bern Wagner.

Track listing
 Digital download
 "Goodbyes" (Radio Edit) - 3:27

Credits and personnel
 Lead vocals – James Cottriall
 Producer – Markus Weiß, Bern Wagner
 Lyrics – James Cottriall
 Label: Pate Records

Chart performance

Release history

References

2010 singles
James Cottriall songs
2010 songs